The Institute of Group Analysis is a training organisation for group psychotherapists in the analytical tradition, based on the groundwork begun by S. H. Foulkes in forming the body of theory and practice now known as Group Analysis.

History and background

The Group Analytic Society (London) was formed by Foulkes and others in 1952, and with a much expanded membership, now functions as an international scientific body. The tasks of training and qualification were delegated to the Institute of Group Analysis (London), which was formed in 1971. The Institute has been actively involved in establishing training programmes in Europe, where there are an increasing number of independent Institutes of Group Analysis and also in the UK. Some of these Institutes and training bodies are listed below.

External links
 Institute of Group Analysis
 Turvey Institute
 IGA Scotland
 Portuguese Institute of Group Analysis
 Irish Institute of Group Analysis
 Munster Institute of Group Analysis
 Institute of Group Analysis Arhus
 Institute of Group Analysis Copenhagen
 Institute of Group Analysis Norway
 Story of the Group Analytic Institute in Stockholm

Group psychotherapy
Psychology organisations based in the United Kingdom